Ymax may refer to:

 WiMax, a wireless telecommunications protocol
 YMAX, the parent company of magicJack, LP, which sells a voice over IP device